Song for My Father is a 1965 album by the Horace Silver Quintet, released on the Blue Note label in 1965. The album was inspired by a trip that Silver had made to Brazil. The cover artwork features a photograph of Silver's father, John Tavares Silver, to whom the title composition was dedicated. "My mother was of Irish and Negro descent, my father of Portuguese origin," Silver recalls in the liner notes: "He was born on the island of Maio, one of the Cape Verde Islands."

Music and reception
The composition "Song for My Father" is probably Silver's best known. As described in the liner notes, this album features the leader's quintet in transition as it features a mix of tracks featuring his old group and his new line-up after Blue Mitchell had left.

AllMusic reviewer Steve Huey praised the album:
One of Blue Note's greatest mainstream hard bop dates, Song for My Father is Horace Silver's signature LP and the peak of a discography already studded with classics...it hangs together remarkably well, and Silver's writing is at his tightest and catchiest.

The album was identified by Scott Yanow in his AllMusic essay "Hard Bop" as one of the 17 Essential Hard Bop recordings.

Track listing
All compositions by Horace Silver, except where noted.

 "Song for My Father" – 7:17
 "The Natives Are Restless Tonight" – 6:09
 "Calcutta Cutie" – 8:31
 "Que Pasa" – 7:47
 "The Kicker" (Joe Henderson) – 5:26
 "Lonely Woman" – 7:02

Bonus tracks on CD reissue:

 "Sanctimonious Sam" (Musa Kaleem) – 3:52
 "Que Pasa (Trio Version)" – 5:38
 "Sighin' and Cryin'" – 5:27
 "Silver Treads Among My Soul" – 3:50

Recorded on October 31, 1963 (#3, 6, 7, 8); January 28, 1964 (#9-10); October 26, 1964 (#1, 2, 4, 5).

Personnel
Tracks 1, 2, 4, 5
 Horace Silver – piano
 Carmell Jones – trumpet (solo 2 and 5, ensemble 1 and 4)
 Joe Henderson – tenor saxophone
 Teddy Smith – bass
 Roger Humphries – drums

Tracks 3, 7, 9, 10
 Horace Silver – piano
 Blue Mitchell – trumpet (ensemble)
 Junior Cook – tenor saxophone (ensemble)
 Gene Taylor – bass
 Roy Brooks – drums

Tracks 6, 8
 Horace Silver – piano
 Gene Taylor – bass
 Roy Brooks – drums

References

1965 albums
Blue Note Records albums
Horace Silver albums
Albums produced by Alfred Lion
Albums recorded at Van Gelder Studio